James Galloway Weir (6 July 1839 – 18 May 1911) was a Scottish businessman and Liberal Party politician.

Biography
Born in Scotland, he was the son of a builder, James Ross Weir. He was a pupil at Dollar Academy before moving with his family to London as a young man. He worked as a travelling salesman for a haberdashery company before he went into business on his own account in 1863 importing sewing machines. He retired from business in about 1879/80 to pursue politics full-time. Weir's brother, John Weir became the secretary of the Fife and Kinross Miners' Association.

He unsuccessfully contested the Falkirk Burghs constituency in 1885, when he got a derisory vote. He was elected for Ross and Cromarty as one of five Crofters' Party MPs in 1892, transferring his allegiance to the mainstream Liberal Party in 1895.  

holding the seat until his death. 

He was also elected to the London County Council in 1892 to represent Islington East as a member of the majority Liberal-backed Progressive Party.

He died at his home in Frognal, Hampstead in 1911 aged 71, and was buried at Marylebone Cemetery.

References

External links

1839 births
1911 deaths
Members of the Parliament of the United Kingdom for Scottish constituencies
Scottish Liberal Party MPs
UK MPs 1892–1895
UK MPs 1895–1900
UK MPs 1900–1906
UK MPs 1906–1910
UK MPs 1910
UK MPs 1910–1918
Progressive Party (London) politicians
Members of London County Council
People educated at Dollar Academy